Hartland Patrick Monahan (born March 29, 1951) is a Canadian former ice hockey player. Monahan played 334 games in the National Hockey League (NHL).

Born in Montreal, Quebec, Monahan's father-in-law is the late Hall of Famer Bernie "Boom Boom" Geoffrion, and is the father of former Major League Baseball player Shane Monahan.

Career
Selected by the California Golden Seals in the 1971 NHL Entry Draft, Monahan played only one game with the Golden Seals before he was traded to the New York Rangers.  During an Intra-League Draft in 1975, he was claimed by the Washington Capitals, where he played for two seasons.  Monahan was traded to the Pittsburgh Penguins in 1977, and would be dealt again during the 1977–78 season to the Los Angeles Kings.  After a season in the minors, he was claimed by the Quebec Nordiques in the 1979 NHL Expansion Draft, and was traded soon after to the St. Louis Blues, where he played until he retired following the 1980–81 NHL season

In 334 NHL games, he scored 61 goals and 80 assists.

Personal life
Hartland lives in Atlanta, Georgia, and is a retired manager for United Parcel Service. Currently "Hart" as he is known by his close friends and associates is the Director of OnlineDonations.us a team and educational fundraising company located in the Atlanta metro area.

In 2014, an ice arena in his hometown of Laval, Quebec was named in his honor after a letter writing campaign.

Career statistics

Regular season and playoffs

External links

Profile at hockeydraftcentral.com

1951 births
Living people
Baltimore Clippers players
California Golden Seals draft picks
California Golden Seals players
Canadian ice hockey forwards
Columbus Golden Seals players
Los Angeles Kings players
Montreal Junior Canadiens players
New York Rangers players
Springfield Indians players
Pittsburgh Penguins players
Providence Reds players
Salt Lake Golden Eagles (WHL) players
St. Louis Blues players
Washington Capitals players
Ice hockey people from Montreal